Albert C. Geyser is known for creating the Cornell Tube in 1905, named after the college with which he was associated. The Cornell Tube was made of heavy lead glass through which no x-rays were thought to be emitted and was thought to eliminate the danger of burning in medical use of the x-ray. Geyser claimed that the lead filtration would eliminate all unsafe radiation. He was known for promoting x-ray to eliminate "excessive hair" to achieve "faultless skin" that would be white and hairless. His invention made him famous and his wedding to Annie S. Higbie was covered in the front page of The New York Times.

Unfortunately, Geyser's experimentation with x-ray radiation on his direct skin forced the amputation of all the fingers, metacarpal bones, and one row of carpal bones on his left hand to stop the spread of cancer. He later lost his right hand to ulcers.

References
Herzig, Rebecca "The Matter of Race in Histories of American Technology" in Technology and the African-American Experience

19th-century births
20th-century deaths
Year of death missing
Year of birth missing
Cornell University faculty
American physicists